Young Rising Sons are an American indie pop band consisting of Andy Tongren (lead singer/guitar), Julian Dimagiba (bass), Max Iantorno (guitar) and Steve Patrick (drums) formed in 2010. With the release of their debut single "High", Young Rising Sons signed with Dirty Canvas/Interscope Records in 2013.

BBC Radio 1 DJ, Zane Lowe named “High” a “Next Hype” track upon its release in the spring of 2014.

Biography

2010–2012: Band formation
Dimagiba and Patrick grew up playing music together in Red Bank, NJ. After watching Andy Tongren perform an acoustic set at a New York City bar, the other members approached him about taking lead vocals in their newly formed band. They wrote music together for several years under different aliases until eventually landing the name Young Rising Sons.

2013–2016: The High and Interscope Signing
Through mutual friends of Andy Tongren, Young Rising Sons were introduced to New York producers Shep Goodman and Aaron Accetta. After hearing Tongren's soulful voice and witnessing the band's incredible chemistry, they immediately signed Young Rising Sons to a production deal with their label Dirty Canvas Music.

The band then went on to collaborate with Dirty Canvas Shep Goodman and Aaron Accetta as well as long time friends Christian Medice and James Adam Shelley to record new music which ultimately led to their debut single “High”.

The video for “High” premiered on Mostly Junk Food and Buzznet. The response was explosive and quickly went viral hitting #1 on Hypem Twitter and landing on the main music page on YouTube. With the well received buzz, “High” instantly caught the attention of tastemakers across the globe including BBC Radio 1 DJ, Zane Lowe, who dubbed “High” his “Next Hype” track.

The band signed with Interscope Records in 2014. With this, Young Rising Sons released a self-titled four track EP through Dirty Canvas/Interscope Records.

Young Rising Sons spent 2014-2015 touring North America with such artists as Halsey, Weezer, Bleachers, Kongos, The 1975, and The Neighbourhood.

“High” was featured in the NHL Awards, MLB Network, Carson Daly, NBC Summer Image Campaign in 2014. The single was also featured on Fox’s hit television show Red Band Society and ABC’s Selfie in 2014 

On Monday, May 2, 2016, the band officially announced via their social media outlets that Dylan Scott would be leaving the band to pursue other interests.

2017-2021 
In 2017 Young Rising Sons announced their departure from Interscope Records.  They went on to release singles, "Whiskey," and "Noise," followed by the "SAD / Scatterbrain" EP in 2018.  The band announced in late fall of 2018 they would be taking a hiatus. On October 16, 2020, the band ended the hiatus and released a new single called "Halloween". They released another new single on December 11, 2020, titled “Sadder”. And on January 29, 2021, Young Rising Sons released the single “Sunday Sunshine”.

2022-Present 
In March 2022, Young Rising Sons self-released their first full-length album, Still Point In a Turning World.

Discography
Young Rising Sons released their debut single "High" on July 22, 2014. The self-titled EP followed, officially released on July 22, 2014, by Dirty Canvas/Interscope Records.

The band released their latest single "Skeletons" on March 5, 2021.

Albums

Extended plays

Singles

References

Indie pop groups from New Jersey
Alternative rock groups from New Jersey
Interscope Records artists
Musical groups established in 2010
2010 establishments in New Jersey